Stephanopus is a genus of fungi in the family Cortinariaceae. The genus, circumscribed by mycologists Meinhard Moser and Egon Horak in 1975, contains five species found in South America.

See also
List of Agaricales genera

References

External links

Agaricales genera
Cortinariaceae
Taxa named by Meinhard Michael Moser
Taxa named by Egon Horak
Taxa described in 1975